At the 2011 Pan Arab Games, the bodybuilding events were held at Al Dana Hall in Doha, Qatar on 10 December. A total of 8 events were contested though dropped to 7 due to doping incidents.

Medal summary

Men

Doping

A major case of doping was found in Bodybuilding where ten athletes were caught using performance enhancing drugs.

The Men's -70 kg was no longer a medaling event as all competitors tested positive.  The lower ranked athletes have since been upgraded, however in some events there were not enough participants for bronze medalists.

Medal table

References

External links
Bodybuilding at official website

Events at the 2011 Pan Arab Games
2011 Pan Arab Games
Bodybuilding competitions in Qatar
2011 in bodybuilding